Manigotagan is a settlement in the Canadian province of Manitoba.

Demographics 

References

Designated places in Manitoba
Northern communities in Manitoba
Unincorporated communities in Eastman Region, Manitoba
Settlements in Manitoba